Hans-Ulrich or Hans Ulrich may refer to:

Hans Ulrich Aschenborn (born 1947), animal painter in Southern Africa
Hans-Ulrich Back (1896–1976), German general in the Wehrmacht during World War II
Hans-Ulrich Brunner (1943–2006), Swiss painter
Hans-Ulrich Buchholz (1944–2011), German rower
Hans-Ulrich Dürst (born 1939), Swiss former swimmer
Hans Ulrich von Eggenberg (1568–1634), Austrian statesman
Hans Ulrich Engelmann (1921–2011), German composer
Hans-Ulrich Ernst (1920–1984), known as Jimmy Ernst, American painter born in Germany
Hans Ulrich Fisch (1583–1647), Swiss painter
Hans Ulrich Franck (born 1603), German historical painter and etcher from Kaufbeuren, Swabia
Hans-Ulrich Grapenthin (born 1943), German former footballer
Hans Ulrich Gumbrecht (born 1948), literary theorist whose work spans epistemologies of the everyday
Hans-Ulrich Indermaur (born 1939), Swiss television moderator, journalist, writer, and magazine editor
Hans Ulrich Klintzsch (1898–1959), Oberster SA-Führer, supreme commander of the Sturmabteilung (SA) from 1921 to 1923
Hans-Ulrich Klose (born 1937), German politician from the Social Democratic Party
Hans-Ulrich Millow (born 1942), German former swimmer
Hans-Ulrich Obrist (born 1968), art curator, critic and historian of art
Hans-Ulrich von Oertzen (1915–1944), German officer in Army Group Centre of the Wehrmacht during the Second World War
Hans-Ulrich Reissig (born 1949), German chemist, professor of Organic Chemistry at FU Berlin
Hans-Ulrich Rudel (1916–1982), German ground-attack pilot during World War II
Hans Ulrich von Schaffgotsch (1595–1635), Silesian nobleman, fought in the Silesian front of the Thirty Years' War
Hans Ulrich Schmied or Uli Schmied (born 1947), retired German rower who specialized in the double sculls
Hans-Ulrich Schmincke (born 1937), German volcanologist
Hans-Ullrich Schulz (1939–2012), German sprinter
Hans Ulrich Staeps (1909–1988), German composer, music professor and professional recorder player
Hans Ulrich Steger (1923–2016), Swiss caricaturist, children's author and artist
Hans-Ulrich Thomale (born 1944), German football manager
Hans-Ulrich Treichel (born 1952), Germanist, novelist and poet
Hans-Ulrich Wehler (1931–2014), German left-liberal historian
Hans-Ulrich Wittchen (born 1951), German clinical psychologist and psychotherapist
Hans-Ulrich von Luck und Witten (1911–1997), German officer in the Wehrmacht of Nazi Germany during World War II
Hans Ulrich Zellweger (1909–1990), Swiss-American pediatrician known for his research on Zellweger syndrome

See also
10032 Hans-Ulrich, minor planet discovered 1981

German masculine given names